In mathematics, an adjunction space (or attaching space) is a common construction in topology where one topological space is attached or "glued" onto another. Specifically, let X and Y be topological spaces, and let A be a subspace of Y. Let f : A → X be a continuous map (called the attaching map). One forms the adjunction space X ∪f Y (sometimes also written as X +f Y) by taking the disjoint union of X and Y and identifying a with f(a) for all a in A. Formally,

where the equivalence relation ~ is generated by a ~ f(a) for all a in A, and the quotient is given the quotient topology. As a set, X ∪f Y consists of the disjoint union of X and (Y − A). The topology, however, is specified by the quotient construction. 

Intuitively, one may think of Y as being glued onto X via the map f.

Examples
A common example of an adjunction space is given when Y is a closed n-ball (or cell) and A is the boundary of the ball, the (n−1)-sphere. Inductively attaching cells along their spherical boundaries to this space results in an example of a CW complex.
Adjunction spaces are also used to define connected sums of manifolds. Here, one first removes open balls from X and Y before attaching the boundaries of the removed balls along an attaching map.
If A is a space with one point then the adjunction is the wedge sum of X and Y.
If X is a space with one point then the adjunction is the quotient Y/A.

Properties
The continuous maps h : X ∪f Y → Z are in 1-1 correspondence with the pairs of continuous maps hX : X → Z and hY : Y → Z that satisfy hX(f(a))=hY(a) for all a in A.

In the case where A is a closed subspace of Y one can show that the map X → X ∪f Y is a closed embedding and (Y − A) → X ∪f Y is an open embedding.

Categorical description
The attaching construction is an example of a pushout in the category of topological spaces. That is to say, the adjunction space is universal with respect to the following commutative diagram:

Here i is the inclusion map and ϕX, ϕY are the maps obtained by composing the quotient map with the canonical injections into the disjoint union of X and Y. One can form a more general pushout by replacing i with an arbitrary continuous map g—the construction is similar. Conversely, if f is also an inclusion the attaching construction is to simply glue X and Y together along their common subspace.

See also
 Quotient space
 Mapping cylinder

References
 Stephen Willard, General Topology, (1970) Addison-Wesley Publishing Company, Reading Massachusetts. (Provides a very brief introduction.)
 
 Ronald Brown, "Topology and Groupoids" pdf available  , (2006) available from amazon sites. Discusses the homotopy type of adjunction spaces, and uses adjunction spaces as an introduction to (finite) cell complexes.
 J.H.C. Whitehead "Note on a theorem due to Borsuk" Bull AMS 54 (1948), 1125-1132 is the earliest  outside reference I know of using the term "adjuction space". 

Topology
Topological spaces